Raymond Tucker (December 4, 1896November 23, 1970) was an American politician that served as the 38th mayor of St. Louis from 1953 until 1965.

Personal life and early career 
Tucker was born in St. Louis, Missouri, and was a 1913 graduate of St. Louis University High School. He later received degrees from Columbia University and Washington University in St. Louis. He married the former Mary Edythe Leiber in 1928 and they raised a son and daughter. From 1921 to 1934, he taught mechanical engineering at McKelvey School of Engineering at Washington University and was chairman of the department from 1921 to 1951.

Tucker served in Mayor Bernard F. Dickmann's administration from 1934 to 1937, during which time he served as City Smoke Commissioner. From 1939 to 1941, he was secretary to Mayor Dickmann's Survey and Audit Committee which sponsored the Griffenhagen Report on St. Louis City Government. In part of 1940 and 1941, he was Director of Public Safety.

Tucker was a member of the committee appointed to write the City's first Civil Service Ordinance in 1940. He headed the 1949 Charter Board of Freeholders whose plan was defeated at the polls in August, 1950. St. Louis' Civil Defense was his responsibility from January 1951 to February 1953. The St. Louis Newspaper Guild gave him the "Page One Award" for civic achievement in 1952. In 1956, he received the St. Louis Award for rallying citizens to work for civic improvement.

Term as mayor 

In 1953, Tucker won the Democratic nomination for mayor in a primary election against Mark D. Eagleton, and was elected in April 1953. During his first term the Earnings Tax was made a permanent part of the City's financial system. A $1,500,000 Plaza Bond Issue was passed in September 1953 and, in May 1955, a $110,000,000 Bond Issue, to support over twenty types of city improvements, was also passed. The City's water supply underwent fluoridation in September 1955. Tucker supported the adoption of the plan for the Metropolitan Sewer District in 1954.

Mayor Tucker ran for re-election successfully in 1957. He backed the proposed City Charter that was defeated August 6, 1957. The increase in the Earnings Tax from one-half percent to one percent became effective August 1, 1959. He opposed the Metropolitan District Plan of 1959 and the Borough Plan of 1962; each would have restructured the relationship between St. Louis City and St. Louis County. He became president of the American Municipal Association (now the National League of Cities) in 1959 and headed the United States Conference of Mayors from December 1963 to April 20, 1965. The City Charter was amended in August 1960 to raise the City salary limit from $10,000 to $25,000. In 1956, the mayor had appointed a committee of building industry people to draw up a new Building Code, which he signed into law on March 31, 1961.

In April 1961, Tucker was elected to a third term as mayor. Significant civil rights legislation was passed in the City during this time, including the Public Accommodations Ordinance in 1961 and Fair Employment legislation in 1963.

In March 1965, during his bid for an unprecedented fourth term as mayor, Tucker lost to Alfonso J. Cervantes in the Democratic primary.

A 1993 survey of historians, political scientists and urban experts conducted by Melvin G. Holli of the University of Illinois at Chicago ranked Tucker as the thirteenth-best American big-city mayor to have served between the years 1820 and 1993.

Later life 

Later in 1965, following his service as mayor, Tucker became Professor of Urban Affairs at Washington University. He died in St. Louis on November 23, 1970, just less than two weeks prior to what would have been his 74th birthday. He is buried in Calvary Cemetery.

References 
Much of the original content for this article was based on the brief biographies of St. Louis Mayors found at the St. Louis Public Library's website, https://web.archive.org/web/20041013215847/http://exhibits.slpl.lib.mo.us/mayors/mayors4.asp

 

1896 births
1970 deaths
Mayors of St. Louis
Columbia University alumni
Washington University in St. Louis faculty
Burials at Calvary Cemetery (St. Louis)
20th-century American politicians
Presidents of the United States Conference of Mayors
McKelvey School of Engineering alumni